= Getpura =

- Village
- Country: India
- State: Haryana
- Region: North India
- District: Ambala
- Time zone: UTC+5:30 (IST)
- Website: haryana.gov.in

Getpura is a village in Ambala district, Haryana, India.

== Demographics ==
Per the 2011 Census of India, Getpura had a total population of 1146 people;596 of those male and 550 female.
